Gottfried August Homilius (2 February 1714 – 2 June 1785) was a German composer, cantor and organist.  He is considered one of the most important church composers of the generation following Bach's, and was the main representative of the empfindsamer style.

Life

Homilius was born in Rosenthal, Saxony, the son of a Lutheran pastor, and was educated at the Annenschule in Dresden.  He then studied law at Leipzig University and the organ under Johann Sebastian Bach. From 1742 he was organist at the Dresden Frauenkirche, and from 1755 until his death cantor at the Kreuzkirche in Dresden with the associated responsibility of music director at the Kreuzkirche, the Sophienkirche, and the Frauenkirche.  After the destruction of the Kreuzkirche during the Seven Years' War he worked mainly at the Frauenkirche.

Works
Homilius predominantly composed church music: more than 10 passions (one printed in 1775; his St. Matthew Passion, particularly outstanding in the preclassical style of C.P.E. Bach and an extremely worthy successor of J.S. Bach's best-known work of the same name, has been recorded on CD), an oratorio for Christmas (1777) and one for Easter, over 60 motets, more than 150 cantatas (six arias from these appeared in 1786), chorales, preludes, and choral works.  He composed also organ music: 36 Chorale preludes for organ. His students included eminent composer Daniel Gottlob Türk as well as Johann Adam Hiller.  His vocal compositions enjoyed great popularity through the 19th century, as witnessed by the large number of copies still extant. A complete worklist and edition is in preparation at Carus Verlag; the Homilius-Werkverzeichnis numbers (HoWV) follow the dissertation of Karl Feld and the new edition of Uwe Wolf.

Passions and oratorios
 HoWV 1.2 Passionskantate "Ein Lämmlein geht und trägt die Schuld"/"Siehe das ist Gottes Lamm..."/Mit väterlicher Stimme"
 HoWV 1.3 Matthäuspassion "Ein Lämmlein geht und trägt die Schuld"/"Und es begab sich"/"Erfüllt mit göttlich ernsten Freuden"
 HoWV 1.4 Johannespassion "Der Fromme stirbt"
 HoWV 1.5 Lukaspassion "Du starker Keltertreter" 
 HoWV 1.10 Markuspassion
 Weihnachtsoratorium. "Die Freude der Hirten"

Organ music
 Gottfried August Homilius: Choralvorspiele für Orgel / herausgegeben von Christoph Albrecht., Leipzig : Breitkopf & Härtel, 1988.

References

Hans John, "Homilius, Gottfried August," Grove Music Online ed. L. Macy (Accessed 13 December 2006) (subscription access)

External links

1714 births
1785 deaths
18th-century classical composers
18th-century male musicians
18th-century keyboardists
18th-century German people
Classical composers of church music
German classical composers
German male classical composers
German classical organists
German male organists
German Lutherans
Organists and composers in the North German tradition
People from the Electorate of Saxony
People from Sächsische Schweiz-Osterzgebirge
Pupils of Johann Sebastian Bach
Male classical organists